Bang Krabue is an intersection and neighbourhood in Bangkok's Thanon Nakhon Chai Si sub-district, Dusit district.

Characteristics
It's four corners of Samsen, Amnuai Songkhram and Kheaw Khai Ka roads in the middle between Si Yan and Kiakkai intersections on Samsen road. Which Kiakkai is the site of Sappaya-Sapasathan a new Parliament House of Thailand.

History
Its name translates as "community of water buffaloes", since in the past this area was a place to deal with the cattle from rancher traders (called in Isan dialect นายฮ้อย) who travel from the Isan (northeastern region) and has stopped the herds of cattle at Saphan Khwai. Before agreeing to deal here. The term krabue (กระบือ) means water buffalo in Thai, which is the same as Khmer (ក្របី).

The area of Bang Krabue on Samsen. It's the road along the Chao Phraya river to Bang Sue, the district is adjacent to the province of Nonthaburi. 

Bang Krabue in the reign of King Rama V was a tambon (ตำบล; sub-district) with 13 muban (หมู่บ้าน; village) under administration of Phra Nakhon province (now Bangkok)'s amphoe Bang Sue. The main route was the waterway by the Khlong Bang Krabue (Bang Krabue canal). It connects the Chao Phraya river and meet Khlong Prem Prachakon (Prem Prachakon canal) in the area of Wat Bang Krabue bridge.

During the reign of King Rama VI, it was filled with rice mills, a large number of ports, docks and warehouses, as well as the location of Praya Bhirom Bhakdi's liquor factory, currently is Boon Rawd Brewery. Including in the winter it was also home to large flocks of migratory gulls that migrate from the northern hemisphere.

In addition, Bang Krabue in the pre-1968 period was also the route of two trams in Bangkok as well.

Nearby places
Boon Rawd Brewery
Royal Irrigation Department
Rajinibon School
Wat Chan Samoson and Wat Chan Samoson School
Makro Samsen
Supreme Complex

References 

Road junctions in Bangkok
Dusit district
Neighbourhoods of Bangkok